Anthony Buich (born May 23, 1978) is a former American football quarterback who played one season with the Grand Rapids Rampage of the Arena Football League (AFL). He played college football at Eastern Illinois University. He was also a member of the Iowa Barnstormers, Tulsa Talons, Tampa Bay Storm, Wichita Stealth, Nashville Kats and San Diego Riptide.

College career
After playing quarterback for St. Ignatius College Preparatory, Buich played for the Eastern Illinois Panthers. He recorded career totals of 27 touchdowns and 17 interceptions on 4,493 passing yards.

Professional career

Iowa Barnstormers
Buich played for the Iowa Barnstormers of the af2 in 2001. He recorded a record of 9–4 as the teams starting quarterback. He threw for 3,021 yards and 58 touchdowns in 13 games for the Barnstormers.

Tulsa Talons
Buich played for the Tulsa Talons of the af2 in 2002. He led the Talons to their first National Conference Central Division championship in 2002 and a 14–2 regular season record. He earned Second Team All-af2 honors in 2002, throwing for 3,004 yards and 64 touchdowns. Buich also completed 66.1% of his passes, which led the league and set a Talons single season record. His passer rating of 116.5 in 2002 ranked him third among all af2 quarterbacks.

Tampa Bay Storm
Buich was signed by the Tampa Bay Storm of the AFL on January 11, 2003. He was released by the Storm on January 25 and signed to the team's practice squad on January 30, 2003. He was leased by the storm on February 20, 2003.

Wichita Stealth
Buich played for the Wichita Stealth of the af2 in 2003, completing 271-of 496 pass attempts for 3,454 yards and 64 touchdowns. He helped the Stealth to a franchise record win total in 2003 with eight victories. He ranked second in passing yards in a season, first in touchdown passes, second in pass attempts, and second in completions in Stealth history after the 2003 season. He also led the Stealth to their second consecutive af2 playoff berth.

Grand Rapids Rampage
Buich signed with the AFL's  Grand Rapids Rampage on January 19, 2004. He recorded 39 touchdowns on 2,600 passing yards for the Rampage in 2004.

Nashville Kats
Buich was signed by the Nashville Kats of the AFL on January 4, 2005. He was released by the Kats on January 31, 2005.

San Diego Riptide
Buich played for the af2's San Diego Riptide in 2005 before suffering an injury.

References

External links
Just Sports Stats
Getting personal: Catching up with Buich

Living people
1978 births
Players of American football from San Francisco
American football quarterbacks
Eastern Illinois Panthers football players
Iowa Barnstormers players
Tulsa Talons players
Wichita Stealth players
Grand Rapids Rampage players
San Diego Riptide players